Grow Up and Blow Away is the third studio album by the Canadian indie rock band Metric. The album was recorded in 2001, but its release was delayed for years due to their record label, Restless Records, being purchased by Rykodisc.

As the years passed, the band's sound changed to the point where they no longer felt the album would be what the fans expected to hear, so Metric recorded a completely new album, Old World Underground, Where Are You Now?, and released that instead. Last Gang Records later purchased the rights to the album and released it on June 26, 2007.

Compared with the 2001 version, the songs "London Halflife" and "Soft Rock Star" (Jimmy vs. Joe mix) from the 2001 EP Static Anonymity were added. "Torture Me", "Fanfare", and "Parkdale" were removed. Also, the order of some songs was changed and other songs (like the title track and "Rock Me Now") were slightly re-worked.

The album's title song (with the lyrics "die today" changed to "fly today") was used in a television commercial in North America for Polaroid Corporation's I-Zone Sticky Film in 2000-01.

Track listing

2007 version
All songs written, performed and recorded by Emily Haines and James Shaw.

"Torture Me", "Parkdale", and "Fanfare" were never re-released.

2001 version (never officially released)
All songs written, performed and recorded by Emily Haines and James Shaw.

References

2007 albums
Metric (band) albums
Last Gang Records albums